Russula graveolens is an edible species of fungus in the genus Russula. The species was first officially described by Swedish mycologist Lars Romell in 1893.

References

External links
 
 

Fungi described in 1893
graveolens
Fungi of Europe
Edible fungi